Breastworks Branch is a stream in the U.S. state of Georgia.

A variant name was "Breastwork Branch". Breastworks Branch was so named on account of a breastwork along its course.

References

Rivers of Georgia (U.S. state)
Rivers of Early County, Georgia